

Order of the Bath

Knight Grand Cross of the Order of the Bath (GCB) 
Military Division
Royal Navy
Admiral Sir John Henry Dacres Cunningham, .
Admiral Sir Henry Ruthven Moore, .

Army
General Sir Ronald Forbes Adam, (1632), late Royal Regiment of Artillery, Colonel Commandant, Royal Artillery and Army Educational Corps.
General Sir Bernard Charles Tolver Paget, (4112), late The Oxfordshire and Buckinghamshire Light Infantry, Colonel Commandant, Reconnaissance Corps, and Intelligence Corps, Aide-de-Camp to The King.
General Sir Thomas Sheridan Riddell-Webster, (1505), late The Cameronians (Scottish Rifles).

Royal Air Force
Air Chief Marshal Sir William Sholto Douglas, .
Air Chief Marshal Sir Edgar Rainey Ludlow-Hewitt, (Retd).

Civil Division
Sir Cyril William Hurcomb, Director-General, Ministry of War Transport.
His Highness Maharaja Sir Sri Jaya Chamaraja-Wadiyar Bahadur, Maharaja of Mysore.
Sir Arthur William Street, Permanent Under-Secretary of State, Air Ministry 1939-45. (Now Acting Permanent Secretary, Office of the Control Commission, Germany and Austria.)

Knight Commander of the Order of the Bath (KCB) 
Military Division
Royal Navy
Vice-Admiral Arthur Malcolm Peters, .
Vice-Admiral Harold Thomas Courtland Walker, .
Vice-Admiral Clement Moody, .
Engineer Vice-Admiral John Kingcome, .

Army
Lieutenant-General Sir Archibald Edward Nye, (5851), late The Royal Warwickshire Regiment.
General Sir Edward Pellew Quinan, Indian Army (Retd).

Royal Air Force
Air Vice-Marshal Alan Lees, .
Acting Air Vice-Marshal John Walter Cordingley, .

Civil Division
Colonel Sir Henry Davies Foster MacGeagh, Judge Advocate-General of the Forces.
Colonel Frank Garrett, Chairman, Territorial Army Association of the County of Suffolk.
Norman Craven Brook, Additional Secretary of the Cabinet.
Sir Godfrey Herbert Ince, Permanent Secretary, Ministry of Labour and National Service.
Sir Robert John Sinclair, lately Chief Executive, Ministry of Production. (Now Chief Executive, Board of Trade.)
Sir Donald Edward Vandepeer, Permanent Secretary, Ministry of Agriculture and Fisheries.

Companion of the Order of the Bath (CB) 
Military Division
Royal Navy
Rear-Admiral John William Ashley Waller.
Rear-Admiral Reginald Henry Portal, .
Rear-Admiral Piers Keane Kekewich (Retd).
Rear-Admiral (E) John Leigh Bedale.
Rear-Admiral (E) Bernard Wilberforce Greathead.
Rear-Admiral (S) Noel Wright, (Retd).
Rear-Admiral (S) Richard Arthur Hawkesworth, (Retd).
Surgeon Rear-Admiral, Albert Edward Malone, .
Acting Major-General Reginald Alexander Dallas Brooks, Royal Marines.
Captain (Commodore 1st Class) Edward Malcolm Evans-Lombe.
Captain (Acting Rear-Admiral) Matthew Sausse Slattery.

Army
Major-General Arthur Branston Austin (15744), late Army Dental Corps, Honorary Dental Surgeon to The King.
Major-General (temporary) John Arthur Mallock Bond, (63454), General List, Cavalry.
Major-General (temporary) William Pat Arthur Bradshaw, (22511), late Foot Guards.
Major-General (temporary) Walter Joseph Cawthorn, 16th Punjab Regiment, Indian Army.
Major-General (temporary) Evelyn Dalrymple Fanshawe, (9530), late The Queen's Bays (2nd Dragoon Guards), Royal Armoured Corps.
Brigadier (temporary) John LeClerc Fowle, late Royal Indian Army Service Corps.
Major-General Alexander Galloway, late Infantry.
Brigadier (temporary) George Alexander Kelly (4675), late Royal Army Veterinary Corps.
Major-General (temporary) Alec Wilfred Lee, (22040), late Infantry.
Major-General (temporary) Ross Cairns McCay, Indian Army.
Major-General David Carmichael Monro, (14493), late Royal Army Medical Corps, Honorary Surgeon to The King.
Major-General (temporary) Alan John Keefe Pigott, (6614), late Infantry.
Major-General (temporary) John Talbot Wentworth Reeve, (14839), late Royal Regiment of Artillery.
Major-General (temporary) Sydney Fairbairn Rowell, Australian Military Forces.
Major-General (temporary) George Neville Russell, (6072), late Corps of Royal Engineers.
Major-General Reginald George Stanham (19499), Royal Army Pay Corps.
Major-General (temporary) Douglas Stuart, late Infantry, Indian Army.
Major-General (temporary) Robert Hallam Studdert, (12232), late Royal Regiment of Artillery.
Major-General Treffry Owen Thomson, (4850), late Royal Army Medical Corps, Honorary Physician to The King.
Major-General (acting) Peter Alfred Ullman, (13319), late Corps of Royal Engineers.
Major-General (temporary) Charles Brian Wainwright, (18120), late Royal Regiment of Artillery.
Major-General (temporary) Walter David Abbott Williams, (21149), late Corps of Royal Engineers.
Major-General (temporary) Edward Ambrose Woods, (15076), late Royal Regiment of Artillery.

Royal Air Force
Air Vice-Marshal Geoffrey Hill Ambler, Auxiliary Air Force.
Air Vice-Marshal Francis Joseph Fogarty, .
Air Vice-Marshal Alan Filmer Rook, .
Acting Air Vice-Marshal Robert Stewart Blucke, .
Acting Air Vice-Marshal Dermot Alexander Boyle, .
Acting Air Vice-Marshal Hugh Alex Constantine, .
Acting Air Vice-Marshal Ernest John Cuckney, .
Acting Air Vice-Marshal Gilbert Harcourt-Smith, .
Acting Air Vice-Marshal Francis Frederic Inglis, .
Acting Air Vice-Marshal Albert Frank Lang, .
Acting Air Vice-Marshal Colin Winterbotham Weedon, .
Acting Air Vice-Marshal John Rene Whitley, .
Acting Air Vice-Marshal William Munro Yool, .
Air Commodore George Gaywood Banting, .
Air Commodore Allan Hesketh, .
Air Commodore Herbert William Heslop, .
Air Commodore George Stacey Hodson, .
Air Commodore Harold Douglas Jackman, .
Air Commodore John Lawrence Kirby, .
Air Commodore Francis William Long.
Air Commodore Harold Jace Roach, .
Air Commodore Charles Gainer Smith, .
Air Commodore Gilbert Formby Smylie, .
Air Commodore Cecil George Wigglesworth, .
Air Commodore Harry Leonard Woolveridge, .
Acting Air Commodore Norman Stuart Allinson.
Acting Air Commodore Francis Robert Banks, .
Acting Air Commodore Clayton Descou Clement Boyce, .
Acting Air Commodore Reginald Byrne, .
Acting Air Commodore Henry Iliffe Cozens, .
Acting Air Commodore Edward Hedley Fielden, .
Acting Air Commodore Leslie Gordon Harvey.
Acting Air Commodore Ronald Beresford Lees, .
Acting Air Commodore James Richard Mutch.
Acting Air Commodore Noel Stephen Paynter.
Acting Air Commodore Thomas Geoffrey Pike, .
Acting Air Commodore Laurence Frank Sinclair, .
Acting Air Commodore Frank Woolley, .
Group Captain Frederick Charles Victor Laws, .

Civil Division
Lawrence Collingwood Williamson.
Frederick Brundrett
Colonel Sir Charles Leyshon Dillwyn-Venables-Llewelyn, President and Chairman, Territorial Army Association of the County of Radnor.
Colonel Geoffry Christie-Miller, Chairman, Territorial Army and Air Force Association of the County of Chester.
Lieutenant-Colonel Sir Graham Percival Heywood, Chairman, Territorial Army Association of the County of Stafford.
Colonel Harry Storey Tawse, Chairman, Territorial Army and Air Force Association of the City of Aberdeen.
Colonel Henry Cecil Lloyd Howard, Chairman, Territorial Army Association of the County of Flint.
Solly Zuckerman, Scientific Director, Royal Air Force Bombing Analysis Unit. In recognition of distinguished service.
Reginald Victor Jones, Assistant Director of Intelligence (Science), Air Ministry. In recognition of distinguished service.
Sidney Alfred Bailey, Principal Assistant Secretary, Ministry of War Transport.
Rex George Bennett, Director, Contracts Department, General Post Office.
Maurice Joseph Dean, Principal Assistant Under Secretary of State, Air Ministry.
Ernest Rowe-Dutton, Principal Assistant Secretary, HM Treasury.
John James William Handford, Assistant Under-Secretary of State, Scottish Office.
Colonel Lawrence Whitaker Harrison, Medical Officer, Ministry of Health.
Arthur Sydney Hutchinson, Assistant Under-Secretary of State, Home Office.
Alexander Johnston, Principal Assistant Secretary, Privy Council Office.
Harold Simcox Kent, Parliamentary Counsel.
John Vivian Kitto, Librarian, House of Commons.
Rouxville Mark Lowe, Chief Land Registrar, HM Land Registry.
Alexander Richardson McBain, Principal Assistant Secretary, Ministry of Supply.
Edwin Henry Simon Marker, Principal Assistant Secretary, Board of Trade.
Frank Cyril Musgrave, Principal Assistant Secretary, Ministry of Aircraft Production.
Thomas Leslie Rowan, Principal Private Secretary to the Prime Minister.
Robert William Arney Speed, Principal Assistant Solicitor, Office of HM Procurator-General and Treasury Solicitor.
Rear-Admiral George Pirie Thomson, Royal Navy (Retd.), lately Chief Press Censor, Ministry of Information.
David Philip Walsh, Principal Assistant Secretary, Admiralty.
Arton Wilson, Principal Assistant Secretary, Ministry of Labour and National Service.

New Year Honours
New Year Honours (Order of the Bath)